Conquest of Mind is a book that describes practices and strategies for leading the spiritual life. Written by Eknath Easwaran, the strategies are intended to be usable within any major religious tradition, or outside of all traditions. The book was originally published in the United States in 1988. Multiple revised English-language editions have been published, and translations have also appeared in several other European and Asian languages. The book has been reviewed in newspapers<ref
    name=ramanujachary04/> and magazines.<ref
    name=coff89/><ref
    name=quest89/>

Background
When Easwaran wrote Conquest of Mind in 1988, he had been teaching meditation in the US for almost 30 years, and had already published a book, Meditation (1978), that systematically explained the details of his method of meditation. This earlier book had briefly described the importance of training the mind as a key part of meditation.<ref
    name=trainpm>The book that describes Easwaran's full 8-point program of spiritual disciplines, originally published as Meditation (1978), states that "Meditation is... a systematic technique for taking hold of and concentrating to the utmost degree our latent mental power. It consists in training the mind, especiallythe attention and will..." (pp. 9-10 in 1978 edition; p.20 in 2008 edition). The book has a section header called "training the mind" (p. 118 in 1978 edition; p. 119 in 2008 edition), and in explaining Point 6, entitled "training the senses," the book states that "training the senses means training the mind as well" (p. 162 in 1978 edition; p. 160 in 2008 edition).</ref><ref
    name=trainmh>Similarly, another book that described Easwaran's 8-point program, originally published as the Mantram Handbook (1977), had a brief section that included statements such as "Control of the mind is something that has never occurred to most of us; to some it may even sound cold or rigid.... But when we learn to control the mind, to slow down its feverish pace, to welcome those thoughts we approve of and dismiss those that are negative, we will find what a sense of mastery this brings..... We can all have such control over the mind that calmness becomes our natural state...." (pp. 45-46 in 1977 edition; pp. 71-72 in 2008 edition). In later editions, these paragraphs were preceded by a section-header entitled "the well-trained mind" (p. 71 in 2008 edition).</ref> In Conquest of Mind, Easwaran provides a much more extensive discussion of how his program can be used to train the mind, and the importance of training the mind.

In his introduction to Conquest of Mind, Easwaran quotes the Buddha's statement that "All that we are... is the result of what we have thought." Therefore, Easwaran says, "nothing... can be more important than being able to choose the way we think." And so, he explains, 

Later, he explains that "This is not a book about the Buddha or his teachings, yet I will mention him often in these pages [because] no one teaches more clearly that mastery of life depends on mastering the mind."

Topics covered
Each US edition of Conquest of Mind begins with an introduction. It is followed in the 1988 and 2010 US editions by five major parts, each divided into 14 chapters. The chapters in Part Four were omitted in the 2001 US edition.

Easwaran's introduction explains how he uses the words "meditation" and "mystic." He cautions that mixing instructions from different perspectives can result in confusion. "If you want to become a tennis champion, you don't take lessons from Vic Braden and Nick Bollettieri at the same time; they have utterly different approaches to the game. Meditation teachers have different approaches too. When Easwaran speaks of meditation, he means 

In Easwaran's language, the "great mystics" — who he often uses as illustrative examples — are people who have attained this goal. "Mysticism," a word Easwaran regards as easily misunderstood, refers to "the conviction, born of personal experience, that there is a divine core in human personality which each of us can realize directly, and that making this discovery is the real goal of our lives."

Part One is entitled "Taking Charge of Your Thoughts." It consists of 4 chapters. Thinking in Freedom (ch. 1) uses the mastery of a skilled surfer or ballet dancer as an analogy for the type of mastery that Easwaran believes all people would like in the art of living. Such mastery is attainable by training the mind, he says, but it requires great practice. Living Skills (ch. 2) describes Easwaran's method of meditating on a passage, its benefits for being present-focused, and for reacting to other people freely, rather than compulsively. Training the Mind (ch. 3) urges readers to think of the various parts of their week, such as home and work, as exercise stations that each provide a special opportunity to train the mind, and reduce egoism.

In Juggling (ch. 4), Easwaran describes feats of juggling that he witnessed in San Francisco's Ghirardelli Square, stating that "what that young man learned to do with his body, you can learn to do with your mind." Mental juggling involves "likes and dislikes.... Can you change your likes at will?.... We need to learn to enjoy doing something we dislike or to enjoy not doing something we like, when it is in the long-term best interests of others or ourselves." Easwaran describes his own experiences in changing his eating habits, stating that he learned from Mahatma Gandhi that "training the palate is a powerful aid in training the mind."

Part Two, "Reshaping Your Life," also contains 4 chapters, entitled Learning to Swim, All Life Is Yoga, Tremendous Trifles, and The Forces of Life. They compare mental skill to swimming, and the mind to a lake; Describe strategies usable throughout the day for deepen meditation; Present examples of the "thousands of little occasions [on which] the mind is taught to be calm and kind: not instantaneously... but in the ordinary choices of the day"; and describe techniques for allying ourselves with an "upward drive to evolve into spiritual beings," rather than with past conditioning in narrow, selfish pursuits.

Part Three, "Strategies from the Buddha," contains two chapters. Obstacles and Opportunities describes how to overcome five obstacles identified by the Buddha: sensuality, ill will, laziness, restlessness, and fear/anxiety. Strategies for Freedom discusses five Buddhist "strategies for freedom," including using "a right thought to drive out one that is wrong," reflection, withdrawing attention, and going "to the root."

Part Four, entitled "Three Spiritual Strengths," contains 3 chapters. They are titled Determination, Detachment, and Discrimination, and describe tools and opportunities for developing each of these qualities, drawing on examples that range from Easwaran's own life to Teresa of Avila, Thérèse of Lisieux, Jacob Boehme, Mahatma Gandhi, Meister Eckhart, Charles Dickens, and space exploration.

Part Five, "Instructions in Meditation," contains a single chapter that describes Easwaran's eight-point program of passage meditation.

Reception
Reviews have appeared in 
The Hindu,<ref
    name=ramanujachary04></ref>
B. C. Catholic, 
and the Bulletin of Monastic Interreligious Dialogue.<ref
      name=coff89></ref>
The Quest,<ref
     name=quest89>  (ejournal), LCCN 94660549 sn 88002619</ref> Conquest of Mind was listed in The Times of India as one of 3 "best books."<ref
     name=toi99></ref>

The Hindu wrote that Easwaran "gives a simple perspective on how to still the mind." and his "ideas are down to earth and his writings unpretentious": 

Later, The Hindu reviewed the Telugu translation of Conquest of Mind. The reviewer, N. C. Ramanujachary, wrote that Easwaran "draws many ideas from the Buddha, throughout the book, but carefully analyses and establishes the continued relevance of his teachings." Ramanujachary stated that 

In The B.C. Catholic, Paul Matthew St. Pierre wrote that Conquest of Mind "addresses issues of mind control... as it pertains to [finding] one's true spiritual self and avoiding getting caught by the forces of secularism, mediatization, narcissism, and self-interest within the world." He stated that 

To St. Pierre, "The paradox in Easwaran's discussion is that, to avoid giving over the mind to the world, one must... transcend the way of thinking that is given over to the world and start thinking for oneself, and in the company of Jesus, St. Francis of Assisi, the Buddha, Sri Krishna, the Sufi mystic Jalaluddin Rumi, and many others."

The Quest wrote that the author "has a wonderfully easy style of writing," that Conquest of Mind "offers clear guidance for training the mind," and that "there probably is no better meditation teacher" than the author.

In the Bulletin of Monastic Interreligious Dialogue, Pascaline Coff wrote that the book is "an interreligious gift to all," a "very successful effort to present the art of training the mind to respond to life’s challenges and discover the True Self in the process—not just a transformation but transfiguration whereby one is love." She added that

Editions
The original edition was published by in 1988 by Nilgiri Press, which also published two subsequent US editions. Two English-language editions have also been published in India, and non-English editions have been published in
Dutch, Indonesian, Korean, Marathi, Portuguese, Spanish, and Telugu.

The US editions are:
 ,  (217 pages)
 ,  (174 pages)
 ,  (183 pages)

The Indian English-language editions are:
  (217 pages)
 ,  (183 pages)

A section of the book was excerpted in Yoga International.

References

1988 non-fiction books
2010 non-fiction books
American non-fiction books
Books about spirituality
Works by Eknath Easwaran